Tyler John Bouck (born January 13, 1980) is a Canadian former professional ice hockey centre who played in the National Hockey League (NHL) with the Dallas Stars, Phoenix Coyotes and the Vancouver Canucks. He spent the last five seasons of his career in Germany with ERC Ingolstadt of the Deutsche Eishockey Liga (DEL).

Playing career
Bouck was a second-round draft pick (57th overall) by the Dallas Stars in the 1998 NHL Entry Draft after three years with the Prince George Cougars of the Western Hockey League. After another two seasons with the Cougars and a brief spell with the AHL's Utah Grizzlies, Bouck finally made his debut for Dallas during the 2000–01 NHL season, playing 48 regular-season games that season, scoring 7 points (2 goals and 5 assists).

On June 23, 2001, Bouck was traded from the Stars to the Phoenix Coyotes for Jyrki Lumme. Bouck only played seven games for Phoenix and played mostly for the Springfield Falcons of the AHL. Bouck's spell with the Coyotes lasted just six months as he was traded on December 28, 2001, along with Todd Warriner and Trevor Letowski to the Vancouver Canucks for Drake Berehowsky and Denis Pederson. Bouck began his Canucks career once again in the AHL with the Manitoba Moose until he was called up briefly to the Canucks roster in the 2003–04 NHL season, playing 18 regular-season games and scoring a goal and two assists for three points.

During the 2004–05 NHL lockout, Bouck was one of many NHL players who played in European leagues, playing for TPS in Finland's SM-liiga. He returned to the Canucks the following season, playing mostly with the Moose.

Without a club, Bouck was invited to the Anaheim Ducks training camp on September 10, 2007. After failing to catch on with the Ducks, Bouck was made captain of their affiliate, the Portland Pirates, for the 2007–08 season.

On August 8, 2008, Bouck was signed as an unrestricted free agent by the Buffalo Sabres, Portland's new NHL parent club, and was assigned to remain with the Pirates for the 2008–09 season.

After serving as captain of the Pirates for two seasons, Bouck left the team at season's end on April 27, 2009, signing with Deutsche Eishockey Liga club ERC Ingolstadt.

Career statistics

Awards and achievements
1999–2000 WHL West First All-Star Team

References

External links

1980 births
Living people
Canadian ice hockey centres
Dallas Stars draft picks
Dallas Stars players
ERC Ingolstadt players
Ice hockey people from Alberta
Manitoba Moose players
People from Camrose, Alberta
Phoenix Coyotes players
Portland Pirates players
Prince George Cougars players
Springfield Falcons players
HC TPS players
Utah Grizzlies (IHL) players
Vancouver Canucks players
Canadian expatriate ice hockey players in Finland
Canadian expatriate ice hockey players in Germany
Canadian expatriate ice hockey players in the United States